Siphanthera is a genus of flowering plants belonging to the family Melastomataceae.

Its native range is Southern Tropical America.

Species:

Siphanthera arenaria 
Siphanthera cordata 
Siphanthera cordifolia 
Siphanthera cowanii 
Siphanthera dawsonii 
Siphanthera duidae 
Siphanthera fasciculata 
Siphanthera foliosa 
Siphanthera gracillima 
Siphanthera hostmannii 
Siphanthera miqueliana 
Siphanthera paludosa 
Siphanthera ramosissima 
Siphanthera robusta 
Siphanthera subtilis 
Siphanthera todziae 
Siphanthera vaupesana 
Siphanthera villosa 
Siphanthera wurdackii

References

Melastomataceae
Melastomataceae genera